Time for Livin' may refer to:

"Time for Livin'", a 1992 song by Beastie Boys from Check Your Head
"Time for Livin'", a 1974 song by Sly and the Family Stone from Small Talk
"Time for Livin'", a 1968 song by The Association from Birthday